The FAO Super Cup, is an annual knockout football competition in men's domestic football, based in Odisha, India. In 2018, the inaugural edition of the Super Cup was played. The Super Cup is organised by and named after the Football Association of Odisha (FAO), the official football governing body of Odisha, India. Sunrise Club of Cuttack were the champions of the inaugural edition of the tournament beating the Rising Student's Club.

History
In 2018, the Football Association of Odisha, in a total revamp, introduced the two new leagues to the footballing system of the state; annual knockout football competition in men's domestic football i.e. the FAO Super Cup and the Inter District Football Championship, which will be played among the districts of Odisha.

League format
A three-tier system consisting of Diamond, Gold and Silver leagues; top four teams from the Diamond League, top three teams of Gold League, and the winners of Silver League play-off, would be promoted to the FAO Super cup. A total of eight teams compete in the tournament. In a total revamp of the league, the FAO Football league was converted to second highest level footballing league, as the premier state level football league was introduced by the Football Association of Odisha from 2018.

Results

Results by team

See also
FAO League
Odisha Women's League
Football Association of Odisha
I-League
Indian Super League
Odisha football team

References

Football cup competitions in India
2010 establishments in Orissa
Football in Odisha
Sports competitions in Odisha